XERNB-AM is a radio station on 1450 AM in Sahuayo, Michoacán, Mexico. It is owned by Promoradio and known as Radio Impacto.

History

XEGC-AM received its concession on March 13, 1948. It was owned by Alberto Barragán Degollado and sold to José Raúl Nava Becerra in 1982. The callsign was changed to XERNB-AM in the early 2000s.

It is the sister to a station in Jiquilpan, Michoacán, XEIX-AM 1290.

References

1948 establishments in Mexico
Radio stations established in 1948
Radio stations in Michoacán
Regional Mexican radio stations
Spanish-language radio stations